Reading Buses is a bus operator serving the towns of Reading, Bracknell, Newbury, Slough, Windsor, Maidenhead, Wokingham and the surrounding areas in the counties of Berkshire, Oxfordshire, and Hampshire, England, as well as parts of Greater London. The operating company is officially known as Reading Transport Limited, and is owned by Reading Borough Council.

History

Horse tram era

The origins of Reading Transport can be traced back to the 19th century, when the privately owned Reading Tramways Company (part of the Imperial Tramways Company) was formed. The company was authorised to construct and operate a horse tram route on an east–west alignment from Oxford Road through Broad Street in the town centre to Cemetery Junction. This route formed the core of what became known as the main line of the tram and trolleybus network.

Construction started in January 1879, with the entire line open by May. A fleet of six single-decked cars were initially used, with 31 horses, providing a 20-minute frequency. The cars operated from a depot on the south side of the Oxford Road, immediately to the east of Reading West railway station. By the 1890s the whole fleet had been replaced by double-decked cars operating at a 10-minute frequency. The company made several proposals to add routes and electrify the system, but none of these were implemented, and in 1899 the borough corporation decided to purchase the system.

The purchase deal was completed on 31 October 1901, and Reading Corporation Tramways came into being. The corporation set out about first extending, and then electrifying the system. The extensions were completed by December 1902, and the last horse cars ran in July of the following year.

Electric tram era

The new electric trams started operating in July 1903. Extensions were constructed to the Wokingham Road and London Road (both from Cemetery Junction), and new routes added to Whitley, Caversham Road, Erleigh Road and Bath Road. The trams operated from a new depot in Mill Lane, a site that was to remain Reading Transport's main depot until it was demolished to make way for The Oracle shopping mall in 1998.

The electric tram services were originally operated by 30 four-wheeled double decked cars supplied by Dick, Kerr & Co. In 1904, six bogie cars and a water car (used for keeping down the dust on the streets) were added to the fleet, from the same manufacturer. No further trams were acquired, and a planned extension from the Caversham Road terminus across Caversham Bridge to Caversham itself was abandoned because of the outbreak of World War I. The war also led to a significant maintenance backlog.

In 1919, Reading Corporation started operating its first motor buses. These ran from Caversham Heights to Tilehurst, running over the tram lines and beyond the tram termini. Because of the state of the track, the Bath Road tram route was abandoned in 1930, followed by the Erleigh Road route in 1932. Eventually it was decided that the tramways should be abandoned and replaced by trolleybuses, operating over extended routes. The last tram ran on the Caversham Road to Whitley route in July 1936, and the last car on the main line ran in May 1939.

Trolleybus era

The first trolleybus wiring erected was a training loop on Erleigh Road, which opened in early 1936. This loop was never used in public service, and was subsequently dismantled. Public service commenced on 18 July 1936, on a route replacing the tram route from Caversham Road to Whitley Street. In May 1939, the remaining tram routes from Oxford Road to Wokingham Road and London Road were converted to trolleybus operation, with a short extension from Wokingham Road to the Three Tuns, and a much longer extension from the Oxford Road through the centre of Tilehurst to the Bear Inn. The extended main line, from the Three Tuns to the Bear, still exists today as bus route 17, the town's busiest and most frequent route, and the first to be designated a premier route.

During World War II a trolleybus branch was constructed from the Oxford Road to Kentwood Hill, enabling trolleybuses to replace motor buses with a consequential saving in precious oil-based fuel. In 1949 the Whitley Street line was extended to Whitley Wood and Northumberland Avenue, and a short branch was built to Reading General station. Subsequent short extensions took the system to its full extent, with the Kentwood route running to Armour Hill and the Northumberland Avenue line running to the junction with Whitley Wood Road.

By 1965, most UK trolleybus systems had closed, and the manufacturers of the overhead equipment gave notice that they would cease production. At the same time the trolleybuses were criticised in the local press because they cost more to operate than motor buses and were inflexible, even though the trolleybuses were profitable (Reading's motor buses made a loss), faster and less polluting. Reading Corporation decided to abandon the trolleybus system, and the routes were phased out between January 1967 and November 1968.

The UK's first contra-flow bus lane was instigated along Kings Road, when that road was made one-way in the early 1960s. The trolleybuses continued to operate two-way, as it was considered uneconomic to erect wiring on the new inbound route, London Road. The concept of the contra-flow bus lane was proved successful, and adopted in other places for motor buses.

Expansion and competition

The Transport Act 1980 deregulated long distance bus services. Reading Transport took advantage of this new freedom to start a service from Reading through London to Southend. The service was numbered X1 and was run jointly with Southend Transport. In 1982 the X1 was shortened to run from Reading to Aldgate in East London, under the Goldline brand, and joint operation ceased.

As a result of the legislation that accompanied the deregulation of local bus services in 1986, the operations of Reading Transport were transferred to Reading Transport Limited, an "arms length" company whose shares were held by Reading Borough Council. Bus deregulation also meant that the local council no longer had any power to regulate the routes and fares of Reading Transport, nor could they prevent other operators from starting competitive services within the borough.

In 1991 Reading Transport was rebranded Reading Buses. In 1992 Reading Transport acquired the Reading and Newbury operations of BeeLine, one of the privatised successors to the state-owned Alder Valley. These acquisitions led to Reading Transport operating buses in Newbury, and in the rural areas around Reading and Newbury, for the first time. Additionally, BeeLine had operated a Reading to London service under the LondonLink name, and that was merged into the Goldline service and the resulting service renamed London Line. The Goldline name was retained for use by Reading Transport's non-scheduled service business. The London Line service ceased in 2000.

Reading Buses faced competition on Reading urban routes from 1994, when Reading Mainline, an independent company, started operations with AEC Routemasters acquired from London Regional Transport. Labour shortages created problems for the competitor, and Reading Buses acquired Reading Mainline in 1998. Reading Transport continued to operate the Routemasters under the Reading Mainline brand until they were finally withdrawn in July 2000.

In December 2017, Reading Buses started to serve London again when it took over Green Line Coaches route 702 from Bracknell to the Green Line Coach Station at Victoria via Windsor and Slough from First Berkshire & The Thames Valley. In January 2018 Reading Buses took over 2 routes (2/5), and won Slough Borough Council tenders for an evening service (4) and a Sunday service (6) from First Berkshire & The Thames Valley.

In September 2018, Reading Buses purchased Newbury & District from Weavaway. The companies have worked together in the past, most noticeably on the Jet Black 1 service which operates between Reading and Newbury. In March 2019, Courtney Buses was purchased with 57 buses. In November 2019, routes 2 (which had already been withdrawn as a result of too much competition from Courtney in May 2018, but added back into the company after the purchase in March 2019) and 5 in Slough and Windsor were transferred to the Courtney Buses division, with 2 other routes, which Courtney had taken over from First Berkshire & The Thames Valley (10/15) also grouped in a similar manner. However, First won the tenders for the evening service 4 and Sunday service 6 back.

Route branding

Since 2004, Reading Buses and Reading Borough Council have made a significant investment in upgrading the quality of Reading's main urban bus routes. In autumn of that year, Reading Buses introduced its first branded Premier Route in the form of the number 17, running between the Three Tuns on Wokingham Road and the Bear Inn at Tilehurst via the town centre and Oxford Road, and the linear descendant of the old main line. This was intended as the first in a series of such routes, each providing a weekday daytime frequency of between 3 and 8 buses per hour. Each premier route, or group of routes, would be allocated a distinctive colour, to be used on the buses on that route, and also on maps and other publicity.

Since then the premier route concept has been rolled out on most of Reading's urban routes. In April 2009, a similar concept was introduced to some of Reading Buses' longer distance rural routes. These were rebranded as Vitality Routes, using specially branded green and silver or red and silver buses. In 2014, these too were changed to a colour brand, becoming 'Lime Routes'. Most longer distance and interurban services now have animal related branding, with the lion to Bracknell and the leopard to Wokingham. The lime brand is still retained on the service to Mortimer.

Current operations

Reading Buses
Reading Transport operates public service buses under the Reading Buses brand throughout the town of Reading, and along a number of corridors out to other local towns.  All routes have a colour scheme, a concept first introduced in 2004 with the introduction of 'Premier Routes', where each route or group of routes allocated a distinctive colour.  These colours are used on the buses used on that route, and also on maps and other publicity.  Urban town area routes provide a weekday daytime frequency of between 2 and 8 buses per hour, depending on the route.
Five of the urban routes now operate 24 hours a day, reflecting the level of demand for local buses around the clock:
 Emerald 5 and 6 to Whitley Wood
 Purple 17 between Tilehurst and Wokingham Road Three Tuns (a pub/restaurant)
 Claret 21 to Lower Earley
 Yellow 26 to Calcot IKEA (when IKEA is shut, buses terminate at Calcot Sainsbury)

Out of town routes operate at lower frequency, with between one and four buses an hour.  These operate out as far as Newbury, Wokingham, Bracknell and Riseley:
JetBlack 1 to Newbury
Lime 2/2a to Burghfield Common, Mortimer and Tadley (AWE)
Leopard 3 to Arborfield and Wokingham
Lion 4/X4 to Wokingham and Bracknell 
Pink 25 to Peppard Common
Mereoak Park and Ride 600 to Mereoak Park and Ride, Riseley and Shinfield.
Reading Buses also operate the Hospital Park and Ride service 300, which runs between the Thames Valley Park and Ride and the Mereoak Park and Ride via the Royal Berkshire Hospital and the University of Reading.

The Thames Valley P&R service 400 was indefinitely suspended in July 2022 due to low usage and a lack of funding.

Newbury & District
In September 2018, Reading Buses purchased Newbury & District from Weavaway.

The operated services include:

 1a/1c circulars between Newbury Wharf and Thatcham Broadway
 1d Thatcham Broadway
 2/2a/2c to Wash Common, Tesco Superstore and Pigeons Farm
 3/3a/3c/3x to Hungerford
 4/4a/4b/4c to Speen and Lambourn
 6/6a to East and West Ilsley
 8 to Tesco Superstore
 9/9b/9c to Newbury Racecourse, Tesco Superstore and Pigeons Farm
 103/103a/b/c to the Greenham Business Park and Tesco Superstore
 V1 shuttle service between Newbury Rail Station and the Vodafone Campus.

All services (except 3c, which continues to Thatcham Broadway) serve the Newbury Wharf Bus Station.

The 1a/c/d, 103/103a/b/c and V1 services are operated solely by Reading Buses. All other routes are operated on behalf of West Berkshire Council.

Thames Valley Buses

In December 2017, it was announced that Reading Buses was to take on three services withdrawn by First Berkshire & The Thames Valley in the Slough area. A fourth route was later added. The Thames Valley Buses name, historically associated with Thames Valley Traction, was used for the new services. Operation began on 20 January 2018.

In November 2019, the Thames Valley and Courtney Buses brands began to be combined, which was a gradual process that was complete by April 2021, with Slough and Windsor being the first areas to change over to Thames Valley, adding two more routes. However, a retendering of contracts by Slough Borough Council saw the two tendered routes won back by First. Since then, Maidenhead and Wokingham routes, along with the trading name, have changed over.

Green Line
In December 2017, Reading Buses announced they would be taking over the Green Line 702 from First Berkshire & The Thames Valley, since running the service they have introduced a new service to Heathrow using route number 703.

National Express
Reading Buses formally operated the National Express 925 between Woking and Heathrow, but this contract was suspended with the onset on the Coronavirus pandemic.

Newbury & District maintain two coaches used for various National Express routes, most notably the 507. One of these, 1416, is in Newbury's livery which is used on school contracts when not in use on the express routes.

Obsolete brands

Newbury Buses

Until August 2011, Reading Transport operated public service buses in the town of Newbury and the surrounding rural area under the "Newbury Buses" brand. Two routes were branded using the same Vitality Route brand that was used by Reading Buses, and provide weekday daytime frequencies of two buses per hour. Another longer distance route, to Basingstoke, was jointly operated with Stagecoach in Hampshire and branded as The Link.

When Reading withdrew from all commercial and tendered work in the Newbury area, the majority of work passed to Newbury & District. The Link is now operated by Stagecoach in Hampshire on a revised timetable to reflect the Stagecoach depot being in Basingstoke.

Jet Black 1 was subcontracted to Weavaway Travel in 2011, using several Alexander Dennis Enviro400s, which are owned by Weavaway but are in a route-branded version of Reading Buses livery and are on the Reading fleet system. Additional Enviro400s owned by Weavaway in an all-over black livery are also able to be used on the route.

Goldline Travel

Reading Buses used the Goldline Travel name for its non-public-service bus operations, including services operated under contract for various local employers. Goldline Travel was also responsible for the operation of Fastrack and Daytrack park and ride services and Nighttrack night bus services, all of which are operated under contract to Reading Borough Council.

Goldline Travel had a two-tone green colour scheme, although most services were operated by vehicles in colour schemes specified by the contracting organisation. Unlike services run by Reading Buses, Goldline gave change on their routes. This was mainly for the benefit of visitors who are more likely to use routes such as park-and-ride.

In May 2008, Goldline won the contract to operate route 142 from Checkendon, Woodcote and Purley to Reading; the route was previously operated by Thames Travel. However, when the route was next tendered, in May 2012, the contract reverted to Thames Travel.

In February 2009, the private hire services run by Goldline ceased, and the coaches were all sold.

Loddon Bridge Park & Ride

In 2015, Loddon Bridge Park & Ride route 500 ceased and the site was closed, having been superseded by Winnersh Triangle Park & Ride, following the completion of the new site by Reading and Wokingham Borough Councils.

Kennections
Following a contract win from West Berkshire Council, Reading Buses introduced the Kennections brand in Newbury in September 2016. These routes were previously run by Newbury & District, the bus service trading name for Weavaway Travel, who in turn took them over from Reading Buses' now-defunct Newbury Buses brand. All drivers were TUPEd to Reading Buses.

In April 2020, Kennections was merged into Newbury & District, with the latter name being retained. The app was also changed to Newbury & District in September of that year.

Courtney Buses

In March 2019, Reading Buses purchased Courtney Buses as part of their expansion across Berkshire.

Between November 2019 and April 2021, the Courtney Buses brand began to be phased out.

Fleet
As of January 2022, the fleet consists of 159 buses.

Fuels

Reading Buses has a history of experimenting with biofuels, including biodiesel and alcohol fuel. By 2008, all but one of Reading's bus fleet was fuelled by a mix of 5% biodiesel and 95% conventional diesel.

In late 2007, Reading Buses placed an order with Scania for 14 ethanol-fuelled double decker buses to replace the existing fleet of biodiesel-powered vehicles operating premier route 17. At the time the order was placed, this was the largest order for ethanol-fuelled buses in the UK. These buses started work on 26 May 2008.

In October 2009, it was discovered that instead of the bio-ethanol fuel having been sourced from sugar beet grown in the English county of Norfolk (as had been advertised), it was actually made from wood pulp imported from Sweden. On learning this, Reading Borough councillors launched an investigation into how they and the Reading Transport Board could have been deceived. All the ethanol-powered buses have since been converted to run on the same bio-diesel mix as the rest of the fleet.

Reading Buses had 31 hybrid electric Alexander Dennis Enviro400Hs delivered in 2010 and 2011, however none are now operated as hybrids. One Enviro400H was converted into an experimental battery electric bus in 2019 for use on route 26, while the remaining buses were converted to diesel power and given a full refurbishment.

In May 2013, 20 buses powered by compressed natural gas (CNG) were introduced. These are used on the Greenwave routes, Leopard 3/8/9, Tiger 7 and Bronze 11. A further 14 vehicles arrived in 2014, which work the Lime 2, Leopard 3/8/9 and Pink 22/25.
One member of this fleet, No 420, holds the land speed record for a regular service bus, having achieved 80.82 mph under test conditions in May 2015. It carries a special cow print livery reflecting the fact that the compressed natural gas is, at source, methane derived from cow dung.

In 2017, five CNG-fuelled Scania N280UDs with Alexander Dennis Enviro400 MMC bodywork, the world's first biogas-fuelled double-decker buses, were delivered to Reading Buses for use on the Royal Blue 33 route. One of these buses is named after Richard Wilding. A further 17 CNG-fuelled Scania N280UDs, these fitted with Enviro400 City bodies, arrived in 2018 for the Purple 17 service.

References

External links

 Reading Buses web site
 Greenline 702/703
 Thames Valley
 Kennections
 Page on Reading Transport from Bus Zone enthusiast site

Bus operators in Berkshire
Companies based in Reading, Berkshire
Companies owned by municipalities of England
Transport companies established in 1901
Transport in Berkshire
Transport in Reading, Berkshire
1901 establishments in England